Theodore Edward Eccles (born June 9, 1955) is an American former child actor and executive producer.

Career
Eccles performed much of his best known roles as a child actor. He appeared in several television series and feature films in the 1960s and 1970s. Eccles may be best known for his starring role in the 1969 film My Side of the Mountain and the voice of Aaron in the television holiday special The Little Drummer Boy. In his twenties, he was one of the shrunken protagonists in the fantasy adventure series Dr. Shrinker, a segment on the children's television series The Krofft Supershow which was broadcast on Saturday mornings.

He later became executive producer of the TV show Flip My Food.

Filmography

References

Bibliography
 Holmstrom, John. The Moving Picture Boy: An International Encyclopaedia from 1895 to 1995. Norwich, Michael Russell, 1996, p. 309-310.

External links
 
 

1955 births
American male child actors
Male actors from California
Living people
American male television actors
American male film actors
People from Los Angeles County, California
20th-century American male actors